Nicolas Guy Barnett (23 August 1928 – 24 December 1986) was a Labour Party politician and Member of Parliament for South Dorset from a by-election victory in 1962, until he was unseated in 1964, and later for Greenwich from 1971 to 1986.

Education and teaching and development work
He was educated at Highgate School and St Edmund Hall, Oxford. He taught at Queen Elizabeth Grammar School, Wakefield, from 1953 to 1959 and at Friends' School, Kamusinga, in Kenya, from 1960 to 1961. He then worked for various development charities, until 1962.

Parliamentary career
After unsuccessfully contesting Scarborough and Whitby in 1959, Barnett was elected as the MP for South Dorset at a by-election in November 1962  after the sitting Conservative MP Victor Montagu succeeded to the peerage as the Earl of Sandwich. Barnett only held the seat briefly as he was defeated at the 1964 general election.

He was returned to Parliament as the MP for Greenwich at a by-election in July 1971, upon the resignation of the sitting Labour MP Richard Marsh to become chairman of British Rail, and held the seat until his death on Christmas Eve 1986.  The subsequent by-election in February 1987 was won by the SDP candidate Rosie Barnes.

Parliamentary offices
Guy Barnett was Parliamentary Under-Secretary of State, Department of the Environment, under Peter Shore, from 1976 to 1979 (when Labour lost that year's general election) and Joint Secretary of the Parliamentary Group on Overseas Development from 1984 to 1986.

He was a Member of the Parliamentary Select committee on Race Relations and Immigration from 1972 to 1974 and of the Public Accounts Committee in 1975.
  
He was a Member of the European Parliament from 1975 to 1976, as an appointed delegate of the UK Parliament.

Other roles
He was a Member of the General Advisory Council of BBC from 1973 to 1976, served on the board of Christian Aid from 1984 to 1986, a Governor of the Institute of Development Studies from 1984 to 1986 and a Trustee of the National Maritime Museum, Greenwich from 1974 to 1976. He was also a Justice of the Peace.

In 1965, Cambridge University press published his book, By the Lake, about Kenyan culture.

In 1967, he married Daphne Anne Hortin. They had two children, a son and a daughter. He died on Christmas Eve 1986, aged 58.

References

External links 
 

1928 births
1986 deaths
Alumni of St Edmund Hall, Oxford
English Quakers
Labour Party (UK) MEPs
Labour Party (UK) MPs for English constituencies
MEPs for the United Kingdom 1973–1979
People educated at Highgate School
UK MPs 1959–1964
UK MPs 1970–1974
UK MPs 1974
UK MPs 1974–1979
UK MPs 1979–1983
UK MPs 1983–1987